A crew commander or crew manager is a rank within the fire service in the United Kingdom. It is a senior rank to a firefighter, but junior to a watch commander or watch manager.

The UK Fire Service is phasing out "ranks" in favour of "roles" and therefore technically speaking a "crew commander" should not be referred to as a "rank" but a job role, or position within the Fire Service.

The new 'role' came into general usage during 2006 - the equivalent rank was known as leading firefighter.

Differences between the term "crew manager" and "crew commander"

There is no difference in the term "crew commander" and "crew manager". They are the same "rank" or role. A "crew commander" is simply referred to as "crew manager" when on station engaged in daily administrative duties, or non-emergency situations. The "crew manager" is then referred to as "crew commander" when responding to / dealing with  incidents or on the fire ground.

Some firefighters dislike the use of the term "manager", as it implies an administrative role rather than a front line role.

Ranks to roles

Confusingly, firefighters and fire officers still wear markings on their uniforms to identify their role and status or seniority in the Fire Service. This has caused many firefighters and officers to question what "rank to roles" has really achieved.

The new ranks to roles system has caused some confusion amongst firefighters on the fire ground, and from an administrative point of view at officer level. For instance a firefighter would have traditionally known that a divisional officer was a high-ranking officer in the brigade and should be addressed as "Sir" or "Ma'am" (and sometimes should be saluted). However some divisional officers are now known under "role names".

In the old rank system there would have been a "divisional officer" responsible for training new recruits, or a divisional officer in the fire safety department. Clearly both officers are of the same rank but perform different roles.

The new regime tries to resolve this by calling the divisional officer responsible for recruit training a "training manager" whilst the divisional officer in fire safety is a "fire safety manager".

If the officer in question is wearing rank markings on his / her uniform, other personnel can immediately determine his or her seniority. But if the officer corresponds by email, letter or telephone giving their new title other personnel may not be able to distinguish the officer's level of authority or seniority.

This has caused great confusion between neighbouring brigades especially when not communicating in person because they may give their senior officers slightly different titles (they would  wear identification marks on their uniform and therefore their seniority would be instantly quantifiable by officers from other brigades)

Previous ranks and their present equivalents
 Station officer - now referred to as watch commander (B) - 2 impellers on epaulettes
 Sub-officer - now referred to as watch commander (A) - sub officer used to have two silver bars on epaulettes but the new watch commander A role has two impellers on epaulettes, the same as a watch commander (B)
 Leading firefighter - now referred to as crew commander - leading firefighter used to display one silver bar on epaulettes, crew commander has two bars on epaulettes
 Firefighters - no change

References

Fire and rescue service organisation in the United Kingdom